Maurício de Almeida Copertino (born 6 April 1970), commonly known as Maurício Copertino, is a Brazilian professional football coach and former player who played as a defender. He is the current manager of ASA.

Club career
Maurício Copertino played for Santos and Coritiba in the Campeonato Brasileiro Série A. He also spent two seasons with Panachaiki in the Greek Super League.

References

1970 births
Living people
Brazilian footballers
Brazilian football managers
Brazilian expatriate footballers
Santos FC players
Coritiba Foot Ball Club players
Panachaiki F.C. players
Expatriate footballers in Greece
Henan Songshan Longmen F.C. players
China League One players
Expatriate footballers in China
Brazilian expatriate sportspeople in China
Brazilian expatriate football managers
Expatriate football managers in China
Serrano Football Club managers
Botafogo Futebol Clube (SP) managers
Association football defenders
Agremiação Sportiva Arapiraquense managers
Sportspeople from Santos, São Paulo